Ram Nihore Rakesh is an Indian politician. He was elected to the Lok Sabha the lower house of Indian Parliament from Chail in Uttar Pradesh  as a member of the Indian National Congress.

References

External links
Official biographical sketch in Parliament of India website 

India MPs 1977–1979
India MPs 1980–1984
India MPs 1989–1991
Lok Sabha members from Uttar Pradesh
1943 births
Living people
Indian National Congress politicians from Uttar Pradesh